Nang Mahawi ang Ulap is a 1940 Filipino film directed by Lorenzo P. Tuells. It stars Rosa Aguirre, Africa Dela Rosa and Lota Delgado.

External links
 

1940 films
Philippine drama films
Tagalog-language films
Sampaguita Pictures films
Philippine black-and-white films